Karen Khachanov was the defending champion but lost in the second round to Denis Istomin.

Istomin went on to win the title when Marcos Baghdatis retired in the final with a back injury, down 2–3.

Seeds
The top four seeds receive a bye into the second round.

Draw

Finals

Top half

Bottom half

Qualifying

Seeds

Qualifiers

Qualifying draw

First qualifier

Second qualifier

Third qualifier

Fourth qualifier

References
 Main Draw
 Qualifying Draw

2017 ATP World Tour
2017 Singles
2017 in Chinese tennis